Michael Rosenzweig born 1951 in Oranjezicht, a suburb of Cape Town), and grew up on Hiddingh Estate in the Cape Town suburb of Newlands. He is a South African composer, conductor and jazz musician.

Education

Merton Barrow provided him a thorough practical grounding as a performer. This provided the foundation for the development of his compositional gifts and conducting skills.

He then studied composition with Donald Martino at New England Conservatory of Music. Initially he auditioned as a guitarist specialising in jazz. He was accepted and given a substantial scholarship because arranger and jazz composer George Russell wanted him as a solo guitarist for his big band.
Before starting he was able to change to jazz composition. When he arrived he was given special dispensation to pursue the classical composition course.
One year later he was permitted to enrol in a London University MMus part-time course. He graduated from a six year programme in 13 months. His prerequisites included two honours dissertations and passing the undergraduate degree examinations at a minimum of 2.1.
The only internal London University masters degree awarded without A levels or undergraduate degree was conferred on him. This went through full senate meetings three times.

Columbia University then invited him to enter their doctoral programme on full scholarship and stipend. He studied composition with Chou Wen-chung, Jack Beeson, and Patricia Carpenter.

Michael Rosenzweig is cited as one of the very few notable students of Prof Beeson. He is also cited as one of the very small group of Prof Chou's notable students.

See: List of music students by teacher: T to Z#Chou Wen-chung.

He is one of only two cited as notable students of both.

Beeson was the only American to study composition with Bartók, Chou was the editor of all of Varèse's scores, Carpenter was Arnold Schoenberg's assistant at UCLA for the last 12 years of his life).

Michael Rosenzweig also studied theory with Patricia Carpenter and George Perle.

He studied choral conducting with Fritz Weisse of the Berliner Konzert-chor, where he was the assistant and the musical director of the Youth choir, whose Philharmonie debut he conducted. He also studied orchestral conducting with Lawrence Leonard and then with Dr Imdad Husain, a member of the first violins in the Philharmonia orchestra under Otto Klemperer, who then introduced him to Emanuel Hurwitz . He saw Manny regularly for five hour score  analysis and coaching in conducting for several years until the latter's death in November 2006.

Conducting
While assistant at the Berliner Konzertchor, he was music director of their youth choir.
He conducted their Berlin Philharmonie debut, performing music of a complexity never before performed by such a young choir. 

He conducted the Blacher Ensemble, the new music ensemble from the Berlin Hochschule der Kunste in their international venue debut. 

He also conducted Sinfonietta Berlin, his own chamber orchestra in major venues and festivals. The orchestra performed both standard repertoire and contemporary music, including premieres of his own music, and his arrangement of Dvorak's String Quintet opus 77 for string orchestra.

In the UK he has conducted the English Chamber Orchestra, the City of London Sinfonia featuring Gervase de Peyer as soloist.
He also conducted his own string orchestra, London Strings. The premiere and second performances were at St Giles in the Barbican, and then it was resident at St James's Piccadilly, performing 16 concerts. 
Soloists included Yonty Solomon who performed eight concertos with this orchestra.  
He was also music director and conductor of the Buckingham and District Music Society.
In Central and Eastern Europe he has conducted the Moravian Philharmonic, the Slovak State Philharmonic, Sudety Philharmonic in Wałbrzych, Poland, the State Philharmonic of Iaşi and Vidin State Philharmonic among others. He has also conducted the Royal Oman Symphony Orchestra. Included have been performances, premieres and recordings of a wide range of contemporary music.
He has accompanied and recorded with major violin virtuoso Pavel Minev.
He also conducted the European premiere of Gervase de Peyer's new realization of the Mozart Clarinet Concerto and has also accompanied Professor Yonty Solomon , Professor Borislava Taneva and Neil Black , among others as soloist. Since June 2008, Michael Rosenzweig has been Principal Guest Conductor of the Vidin State Philharmonic - Sinfonietta Vidin since September 2010.

Composition
His awards for composition include the Greater London Arts Council Young Composer's Award and the Gaudeamus Foundation, won two years running, coming both first and second in the first year. He held the DAAD Berliner Kunstlerprogramm Fellowship for music in 1990.
This award has been made to Stravinsky, Sessions, Carter, Ligeti, Penderecki,  Dallapiccola, Ginastera, Reich, Pärt, Reich and others of this eminence.
He received this award at age 39. He was the youngest recipient of this award.

Works have been commissioned by the BBC, the London Sinfonietta, the Divertimenti String Orchestra, Nina Beilina.

Rosenzweig's String Quartet No. 2 (1989) was commissioned in October 1988, by the BBC for the Arditti Quartet and delivered in April 1989. It was first performed and recorded in June 1995, and broadcast by the BBC Radio 3 on 3 January 2009 .

Selected works

Commissioned works
Chamber Orchestra
Sinfonietta 1
Sinfonietta 2
String Orchestra
Elegy – for 13 solo strings
Concerto for String Orchestra
Fugue '97
Chamber Ensemble
String Octet
Quartet
Piano Quartet
String Quartet 2
Trio
Trio for Oboe, Oboe d'Amore and Cor Anglais – GLA Young Composer Award
Piano Trio – GLA Young Composer Award
Duo
Duo for Clarinet and Piano
Duo for Violin and Piano
Song Cycle for High Voice and Piano
Solo
Solo for Flute
Solo for Bass Clarinet
Solo for Multipercussion
Solo for Vibraphone
Solo for Soprano Saxophone

Other works
Orchestra
Symphony in One Movement – Vaughan Williams Trust Competition & Gaudeamus Award
Choir
Chorale – SATB
Quartet
String Quartet 1 – U Mass Bay Harbor Competition, GLA Young Composer Award
''Solo'
Solo for Bass Clarinet

Partial References

External links
 
 Home Page

1951 births
Living people
20th-century classical composers
21st-century classical composers
South African classical musicians
South African composers
South African male composers
British classical composers
British male classical composers
20th-century British composers
20th-century British male musicians
21st-century British male musicians